Tremenico is a comune (municipality) in the Province of Lecco in the Italian region Lombardy, located about  north of Milan and about  north of Lecco.

Tremenico borders the following municipalities: Casargo, Colico, Dervio, Dorio, Introzzo, Pagnona, Vendrogno.

References

External links
 Official website

Cities and towns in Lombardy
Valsassina